Thoreson Peak is one of the highest peaks (1200 m) on the rock bluffs at the south side of New Harbour on Scott Coast, Victoria Land, Antarctica. The peak is 3.2 nautical miles (6 km) west-southwest of Stewart Peak. Named by Advisory Committee on Antarctic Names (US-ACAN) (2000) after Ronald D. Thoreson, biology laboratory manager with the winter party at McMurdo Station, 1970.

References

Mountains of Victoria Land
Scott Coast